HCL Sametime Premium (formerly IBM Sametime and IBM Lotus Sametime) is a client–server application and middleware platform that provides real-time, unified communications and collaboration for enterprises. Those capabilities include presence information, enterprise instant messaging, web conferencing, community collaboration, and telephony capabilities and integration. Currently it is developed and sold by HCL Software, a division of Indian company HCL Technologies, until 2019 by the Lotus Software division of IBM.

Because HCL Sametime is middleware, it supports enterprise software and business process integration (Communication Enabled Business Process), either through an HCL Sametime plugin or by surfacing HCL Sametime capabilities through third-party applications. HCL Sametime integrates with a wide variety of software, including Lotus collaboration products, Microsoft Office productivity software, and portal and Web applications.

Features
HCL Sametime Premium Features:

HCL Sametime Premium (v11.5)

 Instant meetings & persistent chat
 Personal meeting rooms
 Multiple screen-share per meeting
 Moderator Controls
 Video meeting options 
 Desktop App, Web & Mobile
 Meeting Recording 
 Calendar integrations
 Livestreaming capability
 Secure data
 Flexible deployment (Cloud, on-premises or hybrid)
 Admin policies at the user, group and server level
 Inbound/outbound telephony support 

Features - Previous Versions through 11.0:

HCL Sametime is a client–server enterprise application that includes the HCL Sametime Connect client for end-users and the HCL Sametime Server for control and administration. HCL Sametime (pre v11.5) comes in four levels of functionality:

HCL Sametime Limited Use (Old name HCL Sametime Entry) provides basic presence and instant messaging.

HCL Sametime Standard provides additional functionality to HCL Sametime Entry, including:
 rich presence including location awareness
 rich-media chat, including point-to-point Voice-over-IP (VoIP) and video chat, timestamps, emoticons, and chat histories
 group and multi-way chat
 web conferencing
 contact business cards
 interoperability with public IM networks via the HCL Sametime Gateway, including AOL Instant Messenger, Yahoo! Messenger, Google Talk and XMPP-based services.
 open APIs that allow integrations between HCL's own and other applications
 Sametime Audio/Video Services supports audio (e.g. G.722.1) and video codecs (e.g. H.264)

HCL Sametime Advanced provides additional real-time community collaboration and social networking functionality to HCL Sametime Standard, including:
 persistent chat rooms
 instant screen sharing
 geographic location services

HCL Sametime Unified Telephony provides additional telephony functionality to HCL Sametime Standard or HCL Sametime Advanced, including:
 telephony presence
 softphone
 click-to-call and click-to-conference
 incoming call management
 call control with live call transfer
 connectivity to, and integration of, multiple telephone systems - both IP private branch exchange (IP-PBX) and legacy time-division multiplexing (TDM) systems

HCL Sametime Gateway provides server-to-server interoperability between disparate communities with conversion services for different protocols, presence information awareness, and instant messaging. HCL Sametime Gateway connects HCL Sametime instant messaging cooperate communities with external communities, including external HCL Sametime, and public instant messaging communities, such as: AOL, AIM, ICQ, Yahoo, Google Talk, and XMPP. HCL Sametime Gateway replaces the Sametime Session Initiation Protocol (SIP) Gateway from earlier releases of HCL Sametime.

The HCL Sametime Gateway platform is based on IBM WebSphere Application Server, which provides failover, clustering, and scalability for the HCL Sametime Gateway deployment.
The product is shipped with the following connectors: Virtual Places, SIP, and XMPP. More protocol connectors may be added.

Platform support, APIs and application integration
Because HCL Sametime is middleware, it supports application and business process integration. When within the context of real-time communications, this is often referred to as Communications Enabled Business Processes. Sametime integrates in either of two ways:

 by surfacing the application into an HCL Sametime plug-in
 by surfacing HCL Sametime capabilities into the target application

Some examples of integration between HCL Sametime and applications include:
 HCL's products including HCL Notes, HCL Domino applications, HCL Connections, HCL Quickr
 Microsoft office-productivity software including Microsoft Office, Microsoft Outlook, and Microsoft Sharepoint
 portal applications, including portals built with IBM WebSphere Portal
 web applications
 packaged enterprise applications
 embedded and client–server telephony applications

HCL Sametime Connect, the client component of HCL Sametime, is built on the Eclipse platform, allowing developers familiar with the framework to easily write plug-ins for HCL Sametime. It uses a proprietary protocol named Virtual Places, but also offers support for standard protocols, including Session Initiation Protocol (SIP), SIMPLE, T.120, XMPP, and H.323.

HCL Sametime Connect can run under Microsoft Windows, Linux, and macOS.  Also available are a zero-download web client for Microsoft Internet Explorer, Mozilla Firefox and Apple Safari; mobile clients are also supported for Apple iPhone, Android, Microsoft Windows Mobile, RIM Blackberry, and Symbian. The HCL Sametime server runs on Microsoft Windows, IBM AIX, IBM i (formerly i5/OS), Linux and Solaris. Sametime can also be accessed using the free software Adium, Gaim, Pidgin, and Kopete clients.

History
HCL Sametime became an IBM product in 1998 as the synthesis of technologies IBM acquired from two companies:

 an American company called Databeam provided the architecture to host T.120 dataconferencing (for web messaging) and H.323 Multi-Media Conferencing
 Ubique, an Israeli company whose Virtual Places Chat software technology (also known as VPBuddy) provided the "presence awareness" functionality that allows people to detect which of their contacts are online and available for messaging or conferencing

The Sametime v3.1 client was part of the standard platform loaded by the IBM Standard Software Installer (ISSI) for many years, enabling communications over the corporate intranet by hundreds of thousands of IBM employees.  The next major release was the Sametime v7.5 client, built on the Eclipse (software) platform, enabling the use of the plug-in framework.

In 2008 Gartner positioned IBM for the first time as a "leader" in Gartner's Unified Communications Magic Quadrant.

Version

References

External links

Apple Store
Google Play

Web conferencing
Teleconferencing
Sametime
Windows Internet software
Internet software for Linux
Instant messaging server software
Symbian instant messaging clients
Videotelephony